Wishram is a train station in Wishram, Washington served by Amtrak's Empire Builder line. The station consists of a platform adjacent to a modern, pre-fabricated building that contains BNSF offices. Although Wishram is one of the smallest communities served by Amtrak, it is an important gateway to the scenic recreational opportunities offered by the Columbia River. Amtrak does not provide ticketing or baggage services at this facility, which is served by two daily trains. The station, parking, track, and platforms are owned by BNSF Railway.

The first passenger trains to serve Wishram began on December 15, 1907 with the opening of the Portland and Seattle Railway.

Notes and references

External links 

Amtrak stations in Washington (state)
Transportation buildings and structures in Klickitat County, Washington